Katianiridae is a family of crustaceans belonging to the order Isopoda.

Genera:
 Katianir  Hansen, 1916
 Natalianira Kensley, 1984

References

Isopoda